Until 1 January 2007 Sydthy municipality was a Danish municipality (Danish, kommune) in the former Viborg County on the west coast of Vendsyssel-Thy, a part of the Jutland peninsula in west Denmark.  It is on the north bank of the Limfjord.  The municipality covered an area of 322 km², and had a total population of 11,239 (2005).  Its last mayor was Arne Hyldahl, a member of the Venstre (Liberal Party) political party. The main town and the site of its municipal council was the town of Hurup.

Sydthy municipality ceased to exist as the result of Kommunalreformen ("The Municipality Reform" of 2007).  It was merged with existing Hanstholm and Thisted municipalities to form a new Thisted municipality.  This create a municipality with an area of 1,072 km² and a total population of 46,158 (2005).  The new municipality belongs to Region Nordjylland ("North Jutland Region").

Gallery

External links
 Thisted municipality's official website (Danish only)

References  
 Municipal statistics: NetBorger Kommunefakta, delivered from KMD aka Kommunedata (Municipal Data)
 Municipal mergers and neighbors: Eniro new municipalities map

Former municipalities of Denmark